Svanidze is a Georgian surname, which may refer to:

The family associated with Joseph Stalin:
 Alexander Svanidze (1886–1941),  brother-in-law of Stalin, executed during Great Purge
 Ivan Svanidze (1927–1990), son of Alexander, briefly married to Stalin's daughter, Svetlana Alliluyeva
 Ketevan Svanidze (1880–1907), first wife of Joseph Stalin
 Nikolai Svanidze (born 1955), Russian TV host of Georgian origin, cousin of Ketevan and Alexander

Other people with the surname:
 Natela Svanidze (1926–2017),  Georgian composer
 Rostyslav Svanidze (1971–2002), Ukrainian swimmer of Georgian origin

Surnames of Georgian origin
Georgian-language surnames
Surnames of Abkhazian origin